The 2009 Russian Professional Rugby League season was the fifth season of the Russian Professional Rugby League.

This season saw yet another change in structure for the competition.  The two-stage competition was retained, whereby the championship was still split into East and West.  The somewhat complicated structure was as follows:

Stage One: 
 The professional teams divided into two groups based on geography, East (6) and West (5).
 The top three teams from each group qualified for the Super League (Pos 1 - 6).
 The bottom two clubs from the West entered a play-off stage against qualifying teams from the Federal Leagues to qualify for Stage Two (Pos 7 - 12).
 The fourth (4th) ranked club in the East qualified automatically for Stage Two (Pos 7 - 12).

Stage Two: 
 Super League (Pos 1 - 6)
 Play-offs (Pos 7 - 12)

Stage One East Division

East Division Standings
 Yenisey-STM Krasnoyarsk
 Krasny Yar Krasnoyarsk
 RC Novokuznetsk
 Kosmos Krasnoyarsk
 Rugby Academy Krasnoyarsk
 Siberian Federal University

East Division Fixtures

Stage One West Division

West Division Standings
 VVA-Podmoskovye Monino
 Imperia-Dynamo Penza
 Slava Moscow
 Spartak-GM Moscow
 Fili Moscow

West Division Fixtures

Stage Two Qualifiers

At this stage the two non-qualified West Division teams, Fili Moscow and Spartak-GM Moscow, entered a round-robin stage against teams that qualified from the Federal District Leagues, which were:

 South Krasnodar
 Narva Zastava (St Petersberg)
 Air Force Academy Monino
 Nalchik

The six teams were divided into two groups of three.  The top three ranked sides then entered a final stage in which they were joined by Rugby Academy Krasnoyarsk (after Kosmos Krasnoyarsk pulled out).

Group A Standings

Group A Fixtures

Group B Standings

Group B Fixtures

Final Standings (Pos 7 - 12)

Final Fixtures (Pos 7 - 12)

Super League (Places 1-6)

Final Stage Fixtures

Round One

Round Two

           

 
Round Three

           

Round Four

           

Round Five

        

Round Six

Round Seven

         

Round Eight

           

Round Nine

           

Round Ten

Play-offs

References 

2009
2009 in Russian rugby union
2009 rugby union tournaments for clubs
2009–10 in European rugby union leagues
2008–09 in European rugby union leagues